The 2014 Liga de Elite started on 8 February 2014 and ended on 22 June 2014.

League table

 NB: it is not known why Lam Pak, Lam Ieng and Kuan Tai were excluded or withdrew

Match results

References

External links
Macau Football Association

Campeonato da 1ª Divisão do Futebol seasons
Macau
Macau
1